Acrobasis vinaceellum is a species of snout moth in the genus Acrobasis. It was described by Ragonot in 1901. It is found in Syria.

References

Moths described in 1901
Acrobasis
Moths of Asia